Jharkhand Pradesh Congress Committee (JPCC) is the unit of the Indian National Congress, working in the state of Jharkhand.

Its head office is situated at Swami Shraddhanand Marg, Ranchi. Rajesh Thakur is the current president of JPCC. JPCC also has 4 working President Geeta Koda, Bandhu Tirkey, Jaleshwar Mahato, Shahzada Anwar.

List of presidents

Structure and Composition

Jharkhand Legislative Assembly election

See also
 Indian National Congress
 Congress Working Committee
 All India Congress Committee
 Pradesh Congress Committee

References

External links
 

Politics of Jharkhand
Indian National Congress by state or union territory